Kristian Strøm (24 December 1892 – 10 November 1980) was a Norwegian speedskater.

He set a world record in 5000 m in 1917, when he improved Oscar Mathisen's previous record in Trondheim.  This record lasted four years, until it was beaten by Harald Strøm in 1921.

Strøm became national all-round champion in 1916, 1917, 1919 and 1920, and took five King's Cups.

He represented the club Hortens SK, and chaired the Norwegian Skating Association from 1929 to 1931.

World record 

Source: SpeedSkatingStats.com

References

1892 births
1980 deaths
Norwegian male speed skaters
World record setters in speed skating
Norwegian sports executives and administrators
People from Horten